In physics, a bipolaron is a type of quasiparticle consisting of two polarons. In organic chemistry, it is a molecule or a part of a macromolecular chain containing two positive charges in a conjugated system.

Bipolarons in physics 

In physics, a bipolaron is a bound pair of two polarons. An electron in a material may cause a distortion in the underlying lattice. The combination of electron and distortion (which may also be understood as a cloud of phonons) is known as a polaron (in part because the interaction between electron and lattice is via a polarization). When two polarons are close together, they can lower their energy by sharing the same distortions, which leads to an effective attraction between the polarons. If the interaction is sufficiently large, then that attraction leads to a bound bipolaron. For strong attraction, bipolarons may be small. Small bipolarons have integer spin and thus share some of the properties of bosons. If many bipolarons form without coming too close, they might be able to form a Bose–Einstein condensate. This has led to a suggestion that bipolarons could be a possible mechanism for high-temperature superconductivity. For example, they can lead to a very direct interpretation of the isotope effect.

Recently, bipolarons have been found in a Bose-Einstein condensate. Two polarons interchange sound waves and they attract to each other, forming a bound-state when the strength coupling between the single polarons and the condensate is strong in comparison with the interactions of the host gas.

Bipolarons in organic chemistry 

In organic chemistry, a bipolaron is a molecule or part of a macromolecular chain containing two positive charges in a conjugated system. The charges can be located in the centre of the chain or at its termini. Bipolarons and polarons are encountered in doped conducting polymers such as polythiophene.

It is possible to synthesize and isolate bipolaron model compounds for X-ray diffraction studies. The diamagnetic bis(triaryl)amine dication 2 in scheme 1 is prepared from the neutral precursor 1 in dichloromethane by reaction with 4 equivalents of antimony pentachloride. Two resonance structures exist for the dication. Structure 2a is a (singlet) diradical and 2b is the closed shell quinoid. The experimental bond lengths for the central vinylidene group in 2 are 141 pm and 137 pm compared to 144 pm and 134 pm for the precursor 1 implying some contribution from the quinoid structure.

On the other hand, when a thiophene unit is added to the core in the structure depicted in scheme 2, these bond lengths are identical (around 138 pm) making it a true hybrid.

See also 
 Quinonoid zwitterions

References 

Ions
Quasiparticles